Icelandic orthography is the way in which Icelandic words are spelled and how their spelling corresponds with their pronunciation.

Alphabet 

Icelanders call the ten extra letters (not in the English alphabet), especially thorn and eth,  ("specifically Icelandic" or "uniquely Icelandic"), although they are not. Eth is also used in Faroese and Elfdalian, and while thorn is no longer used in any other living language, it was used in many historical languages, including Old English.

The alphabet consists of the following 32 letters:

The letters a, á, e, é, i, í, o, ó, u, ú, y, ý, æ and ö are considered vowels, and the remainder are consonants.

The letters C (sé), Q (kú) and W (tvöfalt vaff) are only used in Icelandic in words of foreign origin and some proper names that are also of foreign origin. Otherwise, c, qu, and w are replaced by k/s/ts, hv, and v respectively. (In fact, hv etymologically corresponds to Latin qu and English wh in words inherited from Proto-Indo-European: Icelandic hvað, Latin quod, English what.)

The letter Z (seta) was used until 1973, when it was abolished, as it was only an etymological detail. It originally represented an affricate , which arose from the combinations t+s, d+s, ð+s; however, in modern Icelandic it came to be pronounced , and since it was a letter that was not commonly used, it was decided in 1973 to replace all instances of z with s. However, one of the most important newspapers in Iceland, Morgunblaðið, still uses it sometimes (although very rarely), a hot-dog chain, Bæjarins Beztu Pylsur, and a secondary school, Verzlunarskóli Íslands have it in their names. It is also found in some proper names (e.g. Zakarías, Haralz, Zoëga), and loanwords such as pizza (also written pítsa). Older people who were educated before the abolition of the z sometimes also use it.

While the letters C, Q, W, and Z are found on the Icelandic keyboard, they are rarely used in Icelandic; they are used in some proper names of Icelanders, mainly family names (family names are the exception in Iceland). The letter C is used on road signs (to indicate city centre) according to European regulation, and cm is used for the centimetre according to the international SI system (while it may be written out as sentimetri). Many believe these letters should be included in the alphabet, as its purpose is a tool to collate (sort into the correct order). The alphabet as taught in schools up to about 1980 has these 36 letters (and computers still order this way): a, á, b, c, d, ð, e, é, f, g, h, i, í, j, k, l, m, n, o, ó, p, q, r, s, t, u, ú, v, w, x, y, ý, z, þ, æ, ö.

History 
The modern Icelandic alphabet has developed from a standard established in the 19th century, by the Danish linguist Rasmus Rask primarily. It is ultimately based heavily on an orthographic standard created in the early 12th century by a document referred to as The First Grammatical Treatise, author unknown. The standard was intended for the common North Germanic language, Old Norse. It did not have much influence, however, at the time.

The most defining characteristics of the alphabet were established in the old treatise:

 Use of the acute accent (originally to signify vowel length).
 Use of þ, also used in the Old English alphabet as the letter thorn.

The later Rasmus Rask standard was basically a re-enactment of the old treatise, with some changes to fit concurrent North Germanic conventions, such as the exclusive use of k rather than c. Various old features, like ð, had actually not seen much use in the later centuries, so Rask's standard constituted a major change in practice.

Later 20th century changes are most notably the adoption of é, which had previously been written as je (reflecting the modern pronunciation), and the replacement of z with s in 1973.

Function of symbols 
This section lists Icelandic letters and letter combinations, and how to pronounce them using a narrow International Phonetic Alphabet transcription.

Vowels 
Icelandic vowels may be either long or short, but this distinction is only relevant in stressed syllables: unstressed vowels are neutral in quantitative aspect. The vowel length is determined by the consonants that follow the vowel: if there is only one consonant before another vowel or at the end of a word (i.e., CVCV or CVC# syllable structure), the vowel is long; if there are more than one (CVCCV), counting geminates and pre-aspirated stops as CC, the vowel is short. There are, however, some exceptions to this rule:
 The first word of a compound term preserves its long vowel if its following consonant is one of the group , e.g. matmál.
 The non-compound verbs vitkast and litka have long vowels.

Consonants

Code pages 
Besides the alphabet being part of Unicode, which is much used in Iceland, ISO 8859-1 has historically been the most used code page and then Windows-1252 that also supports Icelandic and extends it with e.g. the euro sign. ISO 8859-15 also extends it, but with the euro in a different place.

See also 
 Icelandic Encyclopedia A-Ö

Notes

References

External links 
Guidelines for phonetic transcription

Indo-European Latin-script orthographies
Collation
Icelandic language